Haggerston is a station on the East London line in Haggerston within the London Borough of Hackney, Greater London. The station is located on the Kingsland Viaduct at the junction of Arbutus Street and Frederick Terrace, near Kingsland Road. The main entrance is in Lee Street. The station was built as part of the East London line extension served by National Rail London Overground under the control of the London Rail division of Transport for London, however there is no standard red National Rail "double arrow" logo signage located at the station, instead only the Overground roundel. It is in Travelcard Zone 2.

History

Early history (1867-1923)
When the East & West India Docks & Birmingham Junction Railway (known as the North London Railway (NLR) from 1853) started operating on 26 September 1850, they shared a London terminus at Fenchurch Street railway station with the London and Blackwall Railway which involved a circuitous route via Hackney, Bow and East Stepney for city bound passengers. An act of parliament saw the NLR apply to build a two-mile extension from Dalston to a new London terminus at Broad Street railway station. This was passed in 1861.

The original railway had three tracks and the station had three platform faces. It was situated on a viaduct and was a flat roofed square two storey station building located on Lee Street. Connor suggests the ticket office was at street level and stairs took you up to platform level which were accommodated within the building. The station, which was originally going to be named De-Beauvoir Town was opened on 2 September 1867. It is not known at this juncture whether there were offices or platform level passenger facilities on the top floor of the building. The island platform was accessed by a subway and steps.

A fourth track which did not have a platform face was added in 1872 and used by goods trains to and from Broad Street goods depots.

The signal box was located north of the station between the two sets of running lines.

The London & North Western Railway (LNWR) took over the working of the  North London Railway under a common management arrangement on 1 February 1909 although the North London Railway continued to exist until 1922.

In 1916 the two westerly lines were electrified for Broad Street to Richmond services and the two sets of running lines were known as No. 2 Electrics (west side of viaduct) and No 1 Steam (east side of the viaduct). The electric services did not call at Haggerston as there was no fourth platform provided.

Services
It was initially served by local services from Broad Street to Poplar (East India Road) on the City Extension of the North London Railway. Later Great Northern Railway services to New Barnet, Alexandra Palace, High Barnet and Gordon Hill called during the peak hours. Between 1870 and 1890 some Poplar trains were extended to/from Blackwall.

London Midland & Scottish Railway (1923-1940)
Following the Railways Act 1921, also known as the grouping act, operation of the station fall under the control of the London Midland & Scottish Railway.

Sunday services to Poplar were withdrawn on 29 January 1940. Following that, services were withdrawn on 6 May 1940 as an economy measure during World War II and the following October the station building was badly damaged by enemy bombs. The signal box was damaged by a further raid in April 1941 and was not replaced.

After closure (1940-2010)
The Poplar service continued to pass through Haggerston but this was withdrawn on 15 May 1944 due to bomb damage between Dalston and Poplar and declining passenger numbers.

The station building was demolished in December 1946.

The "Steam" lines (also known as No 1 lines) were lifted sometime during the 1970s and traffic declined at Broad Street until that station was closed on 30 June 1986 with the former No 2 electric lines being lifted soon after. After that the trackbed through the station remained overgrown and unused.

The new station (2010-present day)

The East London line extension saw proposals to extend the East London Line (then New Cross/New Cross Gate - Shoreditch) to Dalston and a connection with the North London Line. This scheme involved using the old Broad Street lines and a new station was proposed at Haggerston south of the original site. 

The new station was designed by Acanthus LW Architects. The design features towers that serve to strengthen the station's urban presence and recall the language of London's stations of the 1930s designed by Charles Holden. The building is clad externally in precast concrete with screens of cast glass planks. Internally, the building features orange mosaic tiling and a large mural to Edmond Halley, who was born in the area.

The former up platform remains (as of 2018) but the original island platform was removed during construction.

Services (2012)
Services are provided by London Overground.  the off-peak service is:

4 trains per hour (tph) to  via 
4 tph to  via Surrey Quays and the South London Line
4 tph to  via Surrey Quays
4 tph to  via Surrey Quays

Connections 
London Buses routes 149, 242, 243 and night route N242 serve the station.

Line

References

External links
East London line

Railway stations in the London Borough of Hackney
Former North London Railway stations
Railway stations in Great Britain opened in 1867
Railway stations in Great Britain closed in 1940
Railway stations in Great Britain opened in 2010
Reopened railway stations in Great Britain
Railway stations served by London Overground
1867 establishments in England
London Overground Night Overground stations
Haggerston